Strigatella testacea is a species of sea snail, a marine gastropod mollusk in the family Mitridae, the miters or miter snails.

Taxonomy
William Broderip described the species as Mitra testacea in 1836; the holotype had been collected by Hugh Cuming.

Heinrich Wolfgang Ludwig Dohrn described M. antoni in 1860 from a specimen also in Cuming's collection. Dohrn classified this species as a junior synonym of M. testacea in 1861. Dohrn's M. antoni should not be confused with M. antonii , sometimes taken to be its senior homonym.

George Washington Tryon proposed that both M. bulimoides  and M. badia  are junior synonyms of M. testacea, but this has not been accepted.

Walter O. Cernohorsky proposed that M. obliqua  was a junior synonym of M. testacea, but this also has not been accepted.

Distribution
It has been found in the Kingsmill Islands, Cook Islands, Society Islands, Tuamotu Islands, Gambier Islands, and the Pitcairn Islands.

Description

References

Further reading

 
 
 
 
 

Mitridae
Fauna of Kiribati
Fauna of the Cook Islands
Fauna of French Polynesia
Fauna of the Pitcairn Islands
Gastropods described in 1836
Taxa named by William Broderip